was a  after Anna and before Ten'en. This period spanned the years from March 970 through March 973.

Change of era
 February 970 : The new era name was created to mark an event or series of events. The previous era ended and the new one commenced in Anna 3, on the 25th day of the 3rd month of 970.

Events of the Tenroku era
 970 (Tenroku 1, 1st month):  became sadaijin, and  became udaijin.
 970 (Tenroku 1, 5th month): The sesshō (regent) and daijō-daijin  died at the age of 71; and the udaijin Koretada then assumed his responsibilities.
 970 (Tenroku 1, 10th month): The sadaijin  died at age 79.
 971 (Tenroku 2, 3rd month): For the first time, a festival (matsuri) in honor of the kami of Iwashimizu Shrine was celebrated.
 April 4, 972 (Tenroku 3, 5th day of the 3rd month): Emperor En'yū's coronation at age 14 is organized by Koretada.
 972 (Tenroku 3, 11th month): Koretada dies at age 49.

Notes

References
 Brown, Delmer M. and Ichirō Ishida, eds. (1979).  Gukanshō: The Future and the Past. Berkeley: University of California Press. ;  OCLC 251325323
 Nussbaum, Louis-Frédéric and Käthe Roth. (2005).  Japan encyclopedia. Cambridge: Harvard University Press. ;  OCLC 58053128
 Titsingh, Isaac. (1834). Nihon Ōdai Ichiran; ou,  Annales des empereurs du Japon.  Paris: Royal Asiatic Society, Oriental Translation Fund of Great Britain and Ireland. OCLC 5850691
 Varley, H. Paul. (1980). A Chronicle of Gods and Sovereigns: Jinnō Shōtōki of Kitabatake Chikafusa. New York: Columbia University Press. ;  OCLC 6042764

External links
 National Diet Library, "The Japanese Calendar" -- historical overview plus illustrative images from library's collection

Japanese eras